Toangoma is an administrative ward in the Temeke district of the Dar es Salaam Region of Tanzania. According to the 2002 census, the ward has a total population of 13,641.

References

Its a ward that is in Mbagala Constituency, Temeke district and Dar es salaam region

Temeke District
Wards of Dar es Salaam Region